Thalaivasal Vijay is an Indian actor and dubbing artist. He was born on 4 August 1962 in Kanyakumari, Tamil Nadu, India. He has acted predominantly in numerous Tamil and Malayalam films.

Career 
Vijay's debut film was Thalaivaasal (1992), which became part of his stage name following acclaim for his performance. He is noted for his character roles, especially in R. Sukumaran's 2010 Malayalam film Yugapurushan as Narayana Guru. The actor is usually seen in supporting and character roles. Vijay, in his career spanning over 30 years, has appeared in more than 260 films.

Filmography

Tamil

Malayalam

Telugu

Hindi

English

As voice over artist

Television

Tamil

Malayalam

Awards

References

External links 
 Official website of Thalaivasal Vijay
 Official Blog

Living people
Indian male voice actors
Male actors in Tamil cinema
Male actors in Malayalam cinema
Indian male film actors
People from Chennai district
Kerala State Film Award winners
Male actors in Telugu cinema
20th-century Indian male actors
21st-century Indian male actors
Male actors from Chennai
Tamil male television actors
Indian male television actors
1962 births